Jules Hulsmans (born 29 September 1898, date of death unknown) was a Belgian modern pentathlete. He competed at the 1924 Summer Olympics.

References

External links
 

1898 births
Year of death unknown
Belgian male modern pentathletes
Olympic modern pentathletes of Belgium
Modern pentathletes at the 1924 Summer Olympics